A list of Kabyle people

Musicians 

 Amour Abdenour, Algerian singer (active since 1969)
 Abderrahmane Abdelli, singer
 Myriam Abel, singer
 Kenza Farah, French singer
 Lounis Ait Menguellet, singer
 Idir, singer
 Lounes Matoub, Berberist and secularist singer assassinated In 1998.
 Daniel Prévost, actor, Kabyle father
 Takfarinas, singer
 Rim'K, singer
  Hakim Rachek, music producer
 Tyssem, singer, one Kabyle parent
 Malika Domrane, singer
 Kamel Messaoudi, singer
 Marcel Mouloudji, singer, actor, writer, artist
 Rouiched, actor
 Souad Massi, singer
 Soolking, singer
 Sheryfa Luna, singer
 Marina Kaye, singer

Actors 

 Isabelle Adjani, actress, Kabyle father, German mother
 Mhamed Arezki, actor
 Dany Boon, comedian, actor, director, Kabyle father, French mother
 Djamila, actress
 Fellag, comedian, actor
 Mohamed Hilmi, actor
 Erika Sawajiri, actress, Kabyle mother, Japanese father
 Yasmina, actress
 Malik Zidi, actor, Kabyle father, French mother

Figures of the Algerian resistance and revolution 

 Colonel Amirouche, Algerian revolutionary fighter, killed by French troops in 1959.
 Krim Belkacem, Algerian revolutionary fighter, assassinated in 1970.
Saïd Mohammedi, Algerian revolutionary fighter (1912 - 1994)
 Belkacem Radjef, Algerian nationalist and revolutionary (1909 -1989).
 Abane Ramdane, joined the revolution in 1956, was assassinated in 1957.
 Lalla Fatma N'Soumer, woman who led western Kabylie in battle against French colonizers.
 Cheik Mohamed el Mokrani, hero of the 1871 uprising, executed by the French the same year.

Politicians 
 Mohand Arav Bessaoud, revolutionary mujahedin, founder of the Academie Berbere and 'spiritual father' of Berberism.
 Ferhat Mehenni, politician, President of the Provisional Government of Kabylia.
 Belaïd Abrika, one of the spokesmen of the Arouch.
 Hocine Aït Ahmed, Algerian revolutionary fighter and secularist politician.
 Saïd Sadi, secularist politician.

Sportspeople 
 Mustapha Dahleb, Algerian footballer.
 Salah Assad, Algerian footballer.
 Azzedine Aït Djoudi, Algerian footballer.
 Camel Meriem, Algerian footballer
 Rabah Madjer, Algerian footballer.
 Zinedine Zidane, French footballer.
 Karim Benzema, French footballer.
 Moussa Saib, Algerian footballer.
 Adam Ounas, french footballer
 Ali Bencheikh, Algerian footballer.
 Ismaël Bennacer, Algerian Footballer
 Nabil Ghilas, Algerian footballer.
 Nadir Belhadj, Algerian footballer
 Karim Ziani, Algerian footballer.
 Kheira Hamraoui, French footballer.
 Houssem Aouar, algerian footballer

Writers 

 Tahar Djaout, writer and journalist assassinated by the GIA in 1993.
 Mouloud Feraoun, writer assassinated by the OAS.
 Mouloud Mammeri, writer and editor.
 Mustapha Ourrad, copyeditor at Charlie Hebdo and victim of attack on their offices
 Salem Zenia, novelist and poet. Novels: Tafrara, Ighil d Wefru.
 Mouloud Mammeri
 Said Sadi

References 

Algerian people of Berber descent

Lists of people by ethnicity
Lists of Berber people